The 2010 Liga Nacional de Ascenso Apertura Final was the final match of the 2010 Liga Nacional de Ascenso Apertura, the 12th season of the second-highest league competition in Panamanian football.

Background
This was the first final match that both teams made it to. Additionally, both teams were created earlier during the year as a result of the expansion project in the Liga Nacional de Ascenso.

Neither team had played each other prior to this final match because they both belonged to different groups.

Match

Details

External links
Video summary of the match

Liga